Mohammad-Hassan Tarighat Monfared (1946 – 30 September 2021) was an Iranian physician and conservative politician who served as the Minister of Health and Medical Education under President Mahmoud Ahmadinejad from March to August 2013. 

He died at the age of 75 after suffering a fall.

Electoral history

References

1946 births
2021 deaths
Iranian physicians
Government ministers of Iran
Society of Devotees of the Islamic Revolution politicians
Politicians from Tehran
Accidental deaths in Iran
Deaths from falls
21st-century Iranian politicians